Christian-Georg Warlich (born 4 October 1957) is a retired lightweight rower who competed for West Germany. In the lightweight men's single sculls, he was German champion on seven occasions (1978 to 1980 and 1984 to 1987). He became world champion in this boat class at the 1980 World Rowing Championships. He rows for Blankenstein RV (Ruderverein).

References

1957 births
Living people
German male rowers
World Rowing Championships medalists for West Germany